Good Times is an album by blues musician Shakey Jake Harris recorded in 1960 and released on the Bluesville label.

Reception

AllMusic reviewer Bill Dahl stated: "The trio located some succulent common ground even without a drummer, Harris keeping his mouth organ phrasing succinct and laying out when his more accomplished session mates catch fire".

Track listing
All compositions by Jimmy D. Harris (Shakey Jake) 
 "Worried Blues" – 2:21
 "My Foolish Heart" – 3:02
 "Sunset Blues" – 6:18
 "You Spoiled Your Baby" – 2:48
 "Tear Drops" – 3:22
 "Just Shakey" – 1:55
 "Jake's Blues" – 1:51
 "Still Your Fool" – 3:12
 "Keep A-Loving Me Baby" – 2:09
 "Call Me When You Need Me" – 3:28
 "Huffin' and Puffin'" – 2:50
 "Good Times" – 3:16

Personnel

Performance
Shakey Jake – harmonica, vocals
Jack McDuff – organ
Bill Jennings – guitar

Production
Esmond Edwards – supervision
 Rudy Van Gelder – engineer

References

Shakey Jake Harris albums
1960 albums
Bluesville Records albums
Albums recorded at Van Gelder Studio
Albums produced by Esmond Edwards